Mohammed Harzan (born 12 January 1989) is a Saudi Arabian professional footballer who plays as a winger for Pro League side Al-Tai.

Club career
Mohammed Harzan started his career at the youth teams of hometown club Al-Suqoor and was promoted to the first team in 2010. On 3 December 2011, Harzan left Al-Suqoor and joined derby rivals Al-Watani. On 15 June 2013, Harzan joined Al-Orobah. However, the transfer failed to go through and Harzan joined former club Al-Suqoor. On 14 December 2013, Harzan joined Al-Watani once again. On 18 July 2016, Harzan joined Ohod. With Ohod, Harzan helped the club earn promotion to the Pro League for the first time since 2005. On 4 May 2018, Harzan joined Al-Taawoun on a two-year deal. On 6 January 2019, Harzan joined Al-Hazem on a six-month loan. On 20 January 2020, Harzan joined Damac on a permanent deal. On 14 July 2021, Harzan joined Al-Tai on a free transfer.

Honours
Al-Suqoor
Saudi Second Division third place: 2010–11

Ohod
Saudi First Division League runners-up: 2016–17

References

External links
 

1989 births
Living people
People from Tabuk, Saudi Arabia
Association football wingers
Saudi Arabian footballers
Al-Suqoor FC players
Al-Watani Club players
Ohod Club players
Al-Taawoun FC players
Damac FC players
Al-Tai FC players
Saudi Second Division players
Saudi First Division League players
Saudi Professional League players